Attorney General Cochrane may refer to:

James Cochrane (judge) (1798–1883), Attorney General of Gibraltar
John Cochrane (politician) (1813–1898), Attorney General of New York

See also
General Cochrane (disambiguation)